Martin Bax is a British consultant paediatrician, who, in addition to his medical career, founded the Arts magazine Ambit in 1959. He lives in London. Since he created it, Ambit has published poetry, prose and artwork from the likes of Fleur Adcock, Peter Porter, Tennessee Williams, J. G. Ballard, Eduardo Paolozzi and many others. He retired as editor in 2013.

His first published novel was The Hospital Ship published by Cape and New Directions in 1976.  More recently Love on the Borders was published by Seren in 2005.  In the 1970s using text from The Hospital Ship he developed the Vietnam Symphony with jazz trumpeter Henry Lowther and this was performed at the Institute of Contemporary Arts (ICA) and subsequently on BBC Radio 3. He has also written for children and his book Edmund went Far Away was published in the US and the UK.

Martin Bax organised regular readings in the UK for Ambit magazine, and jazz events as well, presented at various venues in London and elsewhere including The Betsey Trotwood in Clerkenwell, London and Chelsea Arts Club.

Bax also edits the medical journal Developmental and Child Neurology.

References

Living people
British magazine editors
British writers
Fellows of the Royal Society of Literature
Year of birth missing (living people)
British paediatricians